In the 2012–13 season, USM Bel-Abbès is competing in the Ligue 1 for the 20th season, as well as the Algerian Cup. They will be competing in Ligue 1, and the Algerian Cup.

Squad list
Players and squad numbers last updated on 18 November 2012.Note: Flags indicate national team as has been defined under FIFA eligibility rules. Players may hold more than one non-FIFA nationality.

Competitions

Overview

{| class="wikitable" style="text-align: center"
|-
!rowspan=2|Competition
!colspan=8|Record
!rowspan=2|Started round
!rowspan=2|Final position / round
!rowspan=2|First match	
!rowspan=2|Last match
|-
!
!
!
!
!
!
!
!
|-
| Ligue 1

|  
| 16th
| 15 September 2012
| 21 May 2013
|-
| Algerian Cup

| Round of 64 
| Round of 32
| 14 December 2012
| 28 December 2012
|-
! Total

Ligue 1

League table

Results summary

Results by round

Matches

Algerian Cup

Squad information

Playing statistics

|-
! colspan=10 style=background:#dcdcdc; text-align:center| Goalkeepers

|-
! colspan=10 style=background:#dcdcdc; text-align:center| Defenders

|-
! colspan=10 style=background:#dcdcdc; text-align:center| Midfielders

|-
! colspan=10 style=background:#dcdcdc; text-align:center| Forwards

|-
! colspan=10 style=background:#dcdcdc; text-align:center| Players transferred out during the season

Goalscorers
Includes all competitive matches. The list is sorted alphabetically by surname when total goals are equal.

Transfers

In

Out

References

External links
 2012–13 USM Bel-Abbès season at dzfoot.com 

USM Bel Abbès seasons
USM Bel Abbes